Phlebolepididae is an extinct thelodont agnathan family in the order Phlebolepidiformes.

References

External links 
 

 

Thelodonti
Prehistoric jawless fish families
Silurian first appearances
Silurian extinctions